Mach Dich Bereit is Luttenberger*Klug's debut album.

Track listing
 "Gefangen im Jetzt" – 3:22
 "Mach dich bereit" – 3:18
 "Vergiss mich" – 3:55
 "Heut Nacht" – 3:54
 "Weil es mich nur 1x Gibt" – 3:57 
 "Wolke" – 4:07 
 "Mohnblumenfeld" – 3:55
 "1000x" – 4:01
 "Sommertag" – 3:44 
 "Karma" – 3:53
 "Ich bin noch hier" – 3:51 
 "Du kommst nicht mehr los" – 4:35
 "Erzähl mir von Shakespeare" – 4:03 
 "Super Sommer" – 3:03
 "Madchen" - 3:15 (Bonus Track)
 "Unendlichkeit" - 3:49 (Bonus Track)

Singles

References

2007 debut albums
Luttenberger*Klug albums